The 1980 South Carolina United States Senate election was held on November 4, 1980 to select the U.S. Senator from the state of South Carolina.  Incumbent Democratic Senator Fritz Hollings easily defeated Republican challenger Marshall Mays to win his fourth (his third full) term.

Democratic primary 
The South Carolina Democratic Party held their primary for Senator on June 10, 1980.  Fritz Hollings, the incumbent Senator, won the Democratic primary against two minor candidates; Nettie Durant Dickerson and William Kreml.

Republican primary 
The South Carolina Republican Party held their primary on June 10, 1980.  Marshall Mays, a former state legislator, emerged as the frontrunner and went on to defeat Charlie Rhodes in the runoff election on June 24.

General election campaign 
The Republican Party did not see the race as winnable and Mays received little assistance for his campaign.  Hollings did little campaigning for the race and easily won re-election in the midst of an otherwise strong Republican year.

General election results 

 
 

|-
| 
| colspan=5 | Democratic hold
|-

See also 
 1980 United States Senate elections
 List of United States senators from South Carolina

References 

1980
South Carolina
1980 South Carolina elections